Ulead MediaStudio Pro (MSP) is real-time, timeline based prosumer level video editing software by Ulead Systems. It is a suite of 5 digital video and audio applications, including: Video Capture, Video Paint, CG Infinity, Audio Editor and Video Editor. MSP is only available on the Windows platform.

Since version 8.0, CG Infinity and Video Paint are separate from the MSP suite, and are being sold as a combination product called VideoGraphics Lab (VGL).

On June 18, 2008, Corel formally announced that MediaStudio Pro would be discontinued. The final MediaStudio Pro version was 8.10.0039 (Pro 8 Service Pack 1) released June 2, 2006. Corel discontinued support for MediaStudio Pro in June 2009.  However, there remains an active community of avid users on the official MediaStudio Pro forum.

Version 6.0 is last version to support Windows 95, although recent versions are not compatible with Windows Vista or Windows 7.

Modules
There are 5 stand-alone modules in MSP before version 8.0, they are:
 Video Capture – The video capturing module in MSP.
 Video Paint – A frame-by-frame editor which can let user to make some image or hand-drawing effects on video frames.
 CG Infinity – A vector-based video editing tool which allows user to create logo animation or vector graphics on video frames.
 Audio Editor – The audio editing tool in MSP. It can utilize DirectX audio filters and Ulead audio filters to do audio effect processing.
 Video Editor – The module that users do video editing with audio/video effects. It can also utilize DirectX audio filters and 3rd party video filters to do the video editing.

Since version 8.0, CG Infinity and Video Paint have been separated from the MSP suite and are being sold as a combination product called VideoGraphics Lab (VGL).

Editions
Ulead MediaStudio Pro had several editions before version 7.0. They are:
 Full edition: this edition includes all 5 modules.
 Director's Cut edition: this edition has 3 modules including Video Capture, Video Editor and Audio Editor.
 SE edition: SE means Simple Edition or Special Edition and is an OEM bundle version. It also includes the 3 modules as Director's Cut, however, is feature limited. Sometimes it will be given freely in video magazines.

After version 7.0 only Full edition is available in the MSP suite.

On June 18, 2008, Corel formally announced that MediaStudio Pro would be discontinued.

Release history

See also
 Comparison of video editing software
 Ulead Systems

External links
 Ulead Systems official website
 Ulead MediaStudio Pro home page
 Ulead MediaStudio Pro 5.2 and Matrox compatibility issue
 Ulead MediaStudio Pro 6.0

MediaStudio Pro
Video editing software
Windows multimedia software